The 5th Crunchyroll Anime Awards were held on February 19, 2021, honoring excellence in anime from 2020. Crunchyroll announced the list of categories as well as the judges on December 16, 2020. They noted that the categories used in the previous edition were to be used in this edition as well. They also noted that the number of judges increased. Nominees were announced on January 15, the first day of voting. It ran until January 22. There were 15 million votes cast, with a majority coming from the United States, Mexico, and Brazil. The awards ceremony was streamed live on February 19 as a digital event. It was virtually hosted by Tim Lyu with Crunchyroll-Hime, the official mascot of Crunchyroll. Due to the COVID-19 pandemic, Crunchyroll noted that the show "will look different."

Great Pretender, Jujutsu Kaisen, and Keep Your Hands Off Eizouken! each received ten nominations, followed by Beastars with eight and Tower of God at seven. Among the nominated were Mamoru Miyano, who received his third nomination in the awards, this time for Best Ending Sequence. Voice actor Yuichi Nakamura received his second nomination in the Best VA Performance (JP) category. Yutaka Yamada was nominated in two categories, Best Score and Best Opening Sequence. Jujutsu Kaisen's opening and ending theme were both nominated in their respective categories. Japanese band ALI received two nominations, one in Best Opening Sequence and one in Best Ending Sequence. Directors Masaaki Yuasa and Yuzuru Tachikawa each received their second nomination as Best Director. Fruits Basket was again nominated for a second time in the Best Drama category. Kaguya-sama: Love is War? received its second nomination in Best Comedy. Two fight scenes from The God of High School were nominated for the Best Fight Scene award. Kaguya Shinomiya and Miyuki Shirogane, winners in the previous edition, was nominated again for Best Couple. Kevin Penkin received his third straight nomination for Best Score.

Jujutsu Kaisen won the Anime of the Year award. Kaguya-sama: Love is War? won Best Comedy for the second time. Masaaki Yuasa won his second Best Director as well; the anime that he directed, Keep Your Hands Off Eizouken!, won Best Animation. Kevin Penkin received his second win for Best Score. ALI both won Best Opening Sequence and Best Ending Sequence for "Wild Side" and "LOST IN PARADISE" respectively. Re:Zero − Starting Life in Another World won Best Fantasy, while Fruits Basket won Best Drama.

Winners and nominees

Statistics

References

2021 awards in the United States
February 2021 events in the United States
Crunchyroll